Sierra Print Artist is a computer program from Sierra Home (part of Sierra Entertainment, which is owned by Vivendi SA). The software allows the user to make cards, calendars, stationery and other assorted crafts and then print them with their printer. The current version is 25.

History 
The program was originally developed by Pixellite Group in the early 90s. The DOS version was written by Christopher Schardt. The original Windows version was written by Mr. Schardt, and Ferdinand G. Rios and Tracy Elmore of SAPIEN Technologies, Inc. Vince Mills handled later versions.

The program was first published in 1992 under the name Instant Artist by Autodesk.  After half a year or so, Autodesk decided to abolish its consumer products division. Maxis then published the program under the name Print Artist. In 1995, Sierra On-Line purchased Pixellite Group and the rights to the software and it became known as Sierra Print Artist. It was published under Sierra's "Sierra Home" label and continues to be today despite several purchases and mergers of Sierra On-Line beginning in 1996.
 
The underlying vector-graphics/font-effects technology was developed by Dane Bigham and Christopher Schardt. It was first used in BannerMania, published by Brøderbund, also written by Christopher Schardt. Steve Hales wrote the Macintosh version of BannerMania. Marty Kahn (the author of the original PrintShop) wrote the Apple II version. The technology also found its way into what would eventually become the WordArt add-in for Microsoft Word.
 
A popular feature of the program was the Graphics Grabber, developed by Vince Mills, which enabled the program to handle a catalog of thousands of vector and bitmap graphics, organized by keywords. Sierra Home also publishes Hallmark Cards-licensed versions of the program as Hallmark Scrapbook Studio Deluxe and Hallmark Holiday Card Studio.

Trivia 
Prior to the mergers and purchases in 1996 and beyond, Sierra On-Line often inserted photographs of their own products in the folder which contained assorted JPEG images for use with the software. For example, version 4.0 contained photos from Shivers and Cyber Gladiators.

References

External links
 Official Sierra Print Artist website

Computer-related introductions in 1992
Desktop publishing software
Sierra Entertainment
Windows graphics-related software